Shutter Island is a novel by American writer Dennis Lehane, published by HarperCollins in April 2003. It is about a U.S. Marshal who goes to an isolated hospital for the criminally insane to investigate the disappearance of a patient who is a multiple murderer. Lehane has said he sought to write a novel that would be an homage to Gothic settings, B movies, and pulp. He described the novel as a hybrid of the works of the Brontë sisters and the 1956 film Invasion of the Body Snatchers. His intent was to write the main characters in a position where they would lack 20th-century resources such as radio communications. He also structured the book to be "more taut" than his previous book, Mystic River.

Lehane was inspired by the hospital and grounds on Long Island in Boston Harbor for the model of the hospital and island. Lehane had visited it in the Blizzard of 1978 as a child with his uncle and family.

A film adaptation of the novel, adapted by Laeta Kalogridis and directed by Martin Scorsese, was released on February 19, 2010.

Plot 
In 1954, widower U.S. Marshal Edward "Teddy" Daniels and his new partner, Chuck Aule, go on a ferry boat to Shutter Island, the home of Ashecliffe Hospital for the criminally insane, to investigate the disappearance of a patient, Rachel Solando (who was incarcerated for drowning her three children). Despite being kept in a locked cell under constant supervision, she has escaped the hospital and the desolate island.

In Rachel's room, Teddy and Chuck discover a code that Teddy breaks. He tells Chuck that he believes the code points to a 67th patient, when records show only 66. Teddy also reveals that he wants to avenge the death of his wife Dolores, who was murdered two years prior by a man called Andrew Laeddis, whom he believes is an inmate in Ashecliffe Hospital. The novel is interspersed with graphic descriptions of World War II and Dachau, which Teddy helped to liberate. After Hurricane Carol hits the island, Teddy and Chuck investigate Ward C, where Teddy believes government experiments with psychotropic drugs are being conducted. While separated from Chuck for a short while in Ward C, Teddy meets a patient called George Noyce, who tells him that everything is an elaborate game designed for him, and that Chuck is not to be trusted.

As Teddy and Chuck return to the main hospital area, they are separated. Teddy discovers a woman (in a sea cave he tried to take refuge in) who says she is the real Rachel Solando. She tells him she was actually a psychiatrist at Ashecliffe, and when she discovered the illegal experiments being run by them, she was incarcerated as a patient. She escaped and has been hiding in different places on the island. She warns him about the other residents of the island, telling him to take care with the food, medication and cigarettes, which have been laced with psychotropic drugs. When Teddy returns to the hospital, he cannot find Chuck and is told he had no partner. He escapes and tries to rescue Chuck at the lighthouse, where he believes the experiments take place. He reaches the top of the lighthouse and finds only hospital administrator Dr. Cawley seated at a desk. Cawley tells Teddy that he himself is in fact Andrew Laeddis (an anagram of Edward Daniels) and that he has been a patient at Shutter Island for two years for murdering his wife, Dolores Chanal (an anagram of Rachel Solando), after she murdered their three children.

Andrew/Teddy refuses to believe this and takes extreme measures to disprove it, grabbing what he thinks is his gun and tries to shoot Dr. Cawley; but the weapon is a toy water pistol. Chuck then enters, revealing that he is actually Andrew's psychiatrist, Dr. Lester Sheehan. He is told that Dr. Cawley and Chuck/Sheehan have devised this treatment to allow him to live out his elaborate fantasy, in order to confront the truth, or else undergo a radical lobotomy treatment. Teddy/Andrew accepts that he killed his wife and his service as a US Marshal was a long time ago.

The ending of the novel has Teddy receive a lobotomy in order to avoid living with the knowledge that his wife murdered their children and he is her murderer.

Adaptations

Film

The novel has been adapted into a film by screenwriter Laeta Kalogridis and director Martin Scorsese, starring Leonardo DiCaprio as Teddy Daniels, Mark Ruffalo as Chuck Aule, Ben Kingsley as Dr. Cawley, and Max von Sydow as Dr. Naehring.

The film was originally scheduled to be released by Paramount Pictures on October 2, 2009, in the United States and Canada. Paramount later announced it was going to push back the release date to February 19, 2010; reports attribute the pushback to Paramount's not having "the financing in 2009 to spend the $50 to $60 million necessary to market a big awards pic like this," DiCaprio's unavailability to promote the film internationally, and Paramount's hope that the economy might rebound enough by February 2010 that a film geared toward adult audiences would be more viable financially.

The film opened #1 at the box office with $41 million, according to studio estimates. , this remains Scorsese's highest box office opening. The film remained #1 in its second weekend with $22.2 million. Eventually, the film grossed $128,012,934 in North America and $166,790,080 in foreign markets, for a total of $294,803,014, becoming Scorsese's highest-grossing film worldwide until The Wolf of Wall Street.

Audiobook
The HarperCollins audiobook version of the novel is read by David Strathairn.

The Audible Audio Edition version of the novel is read by Tom Stechschulte.

Graphic novel

The story has also been reworked into a graphic novel published by William Morrow, with art by Christian De Metter.

References

External links
 Interview with Dennis Lehane about the graphic novel adaptation

2003 American novels
Novels by Dennis Lehane
American novels adapted into films
Novels about dreams
Fiction with unreliable narrators
Novels set in psychiatric hospitals
Psychiatry in the United States in fiction
Fiction set in 1954
HarperCollins books
Novels set in the 1950s
Novels set in Massachusetts
Novels set on fictional islands
Neo-noir novels
United States Marshals Service in fiction
Books with cover art by Chip Kidd
Filicide in fiction